The men's tournament in volleyball at the 1972 Summer Olympics was the 3rd edition of the event at the Summer Olympics, organized by the world's governing body, the FIVB in conjunction with the IOC. It was held in Munich, West Germany from 27 August to 9 September 1972.

Qualification

Pools composition

Rosters

Venue

Preliminary round

Pool A

|}

|}

Pool B

|}

|}

Final round

11th–12th places

11th place match

|}

9th–10th places

9th place match

|}

5th–8th places

5th–8th semifinals

|}

7th place match

|}

5th place match

|}

Final four

Semifinals

|}

Bronze medal match

|}

Gold medal match

|}

Final standing

Medalists

References

External links
Final Standing (1964–2000)
Results at Todor66.com
Results at Sports123.com

O
1972
Men's events at the 1972 Summer Olympics